Higher Macdonald is a locality 116 km north of Sydney, in the state of New South Wales, Australia. It is located in the City of Hawkesbury north of Upper Macdonald.

References

Sydney localities
City of Hawkesbury